Blagomir "Blagoje" Krivokuća (born 1 September 1944) is a Serbian former football manager and player. He is the older brother of fellow footballer Petar Krivokuća.

Career
After starting out at his hometown club Javor Ivanjica, Krivokuća was signed by OFK Beograd in 1962. He spent nine years with the Romantičari, making 170 appearances and scoring 15 goals in the Yugoslav First League. In 1971, Krivokuća moved abroad to Germany and joined Freiburger FC. He played for three seasons in the Regionalliga Süd, netting seven times in 64 games.

Honours
OFK Beograd
 Yugoslav Cup: 1965–66

References

External links
 

Association football defenders
Expatriate footballers in Germany
FK Javor Ivanjica players
Freiburger FC players
OFK Beograd managers
OFK Beograd players
People from Ivanjica
Serbian football managers
Serbian footballers
Yugoslav expatriate footballers
Yugoslav expatriate sportspeople in Germany
Yugoslav First League players
Yugoslav footballers
1944 births
Living people